Luciana Granato (born 19 October 1977) is a Brazilian rower. She competed in the women's lightweight double sculls event at the 2008 Summer Olympics.

References

1977 births
Living people
Brazilian female rowers
Olympic rowers of Brazil
Rowers at the 2008 Summer Olympics
Sportspeople from São Paulo